The 2013 Washington Huskies football team represented the University of Washington in the 2013 NCAA Division I FBS football season. The team, coached by fifth-year head coach Steve Sarkisian, was a member of the North Division of the Pac-12 Conference. Sarkisian left the team to become the head coach at USC following the Apple Cup. The team was led by quarterbacks coach Marques Tuiasosopo following Sarkisian's departure. The Huskies played their home games at their on-campus home of Husky Stadium.

Offseason
Former Husky Marques Tuiasosopo was hired in January as the new quarterbacks coach. The offseason saw some attrition with the losses of fullback Cooper Pelluer, safety Evan Zeger, receivers James Johnson and Jamaal Jones, running back Erich Wilson II, and defensive back Darien Washington for various reasons. Running backs coach Joel Thomas left to coach the same position at Arkansas. The offseason also included legal troubles for tight end Austin Seferian-Jenkins and receiver Kasen Williams. Seferian-Jenkins was charged with DUI and served one day in jail as part of his sentencing agreement. Williams was also charged with DUI in a separate incident for which he paid a fine.  Construction on Husky Stadium entered the final stages and the team was able to break it in with the start of fall camp in August.

Weekly starters
The following players were the weekly offensive and defensive game starters.

Roster and coaching staff

Schedule

Game summaries

Boise State

Illinois

Idaho State

Arizona

Stanford

Oregon

Arizona State

Cal

Colorado

UCLA

The Bruins lead the series, 38–30–2. Last time the teams met, during the 2010 season, Washington won 24–7 in Seattle. UCLA was the winner in the Rose Bowl, a 24–23 decision in 2009. The Bruins have won the last seven straight games played in the Rose Bowl against the Huskies.

1st quarter scoring: UCLA – Myles Jack 8-yard run (Ka'imi Fairbairn kick); UCLA – Cassius Marsh 2-yard pass from Brett Hundley (Fairbairn kick); WASH – Bishop Sankey 2-yard run (Travis Coons kick); UCLA – Jack 1-yard run (failed kick)

2nd quarter scoring: UCLA – Jack 1-yard run (Fairbairn kick); WASH – Jaydon Mickens 2-yard pass from Keith Price (Coons kick); WASH – Coons 34-yard field goal

3rd quarter scoring: WASH – Austin Seferian-Jenkins 1-yard pass from Cyler Miles (Coons kick); UCLA – Jack 2-yard run (Fairbairn kick)

4th quarter scoring: UCLA – Devin Lucien 40-yard pass from Hundley (Fairbairn kick); WASH – Damore'ea Stringfellow 14-yard pass from Miles (Coons kick)

Oregon State

Washington State

1st quarter scoring: UW – Travis Coons 48-yard field goal

2nd quarter scoring: WSU – Andrew Furney 49-yard field goal; WSU – Rickey Galvin 14-yard pass from C. Halliday (Furney kick)

3rd quarter scoring: UW – Seferian Jenkins 18-yard pass from Keith Price (Coons  kick); UW – Bishop Sankey 7-yard run (Coons kick); UW – Coons 39-yard field goal

4th quarter scoring: WSU – Dom. Williams 5-yard pass from Halliday (Furney kick); UW – Price 2-yard run (Coons kick)

BYU

1st quarter scoring: WASH – Bishop Sankey 11-yard run (Travis Coons kick)

2nd quarter scoring: BYU – Taysom Hill 1-yard run (Justin Sorensen kick); WASH – John Ross III 100-yard kick return (Coons kick); BYU – Sorensen 45-yard field goal; BYU – Sorensen 31-yard field goal; WASH – Sankey 11-yard run (Coons kick); BYU – Sorensen 32-yard field goal

3rd quarter scoring: WASH – Austin Seferian-Jenkins 16-yard reception from Keith Price (Coons kick)

4th quarter scoring: WASH – Coons 45-yard field goal

Rankings

Notes
 December 2, 2013 – Head coach Steve Sarkisian left the team to take the job at USC
 December 6, 2013 – Chris Petersen from Boise State was hired as the next head coach at Washington

References

Washington
Washington Huskies football seasons
Redbox Bowl champion seasons
Washington Huskies football